Grand Army is an American teen drama streaming television series created by Katie Cappiello that premiered on Netflix on October 16, 2020. It is loosely based on Cappiello's Slut: The Play. In June 2021, the series was canceled after one season.

Premise
The series follows the lives of Joey Del Marco, Dom Pierre, Sid Pakam, Jayson Jackson, and Leila Kwan Zimmer at Grand Army High School, a public high school, in Brooklyn, New York. The students wrestle variously with challenges including rape culture, racism, sexual identity, bullying, violence, and terrorism.

Cast

Main

Odessa A'zion as Joey Del Marco, a high school junior from Stuyvesant Town who is also on the school's dance team
Odley Jean as Dominique "Dom" Pierre, a Haitian-American high school junior from East New York who is also on the school's women's basketball team.
Amir Bageria as Siddhartha "Sid" Pakam, a closeted gay Indian-American high school senior from Jackson Heights who is on the school's swim team
Maliq Johnson as Jayson Jackson, an African-American high school sophomore from Spanish Harlem
Amalia Yoo as Leila Kwan Zimmer, a Chinese-American high school freshman from the Upper West Side who was adopted by a Jewish Caucasian couple when she was a baby
Alphonso Romero Jones, II as John Ellis, Dom's love interest
Thelonius Serrell-Freed as Tim Delaney, one of Joey's friends
Anthony Ippolito as George Wright, one of Joey's friends who is on the Grand Army High School's swim team
Brian Altemus as Luke Friedman, one of Joey's friends who is on the Grand Army High School's swim team

Recurring

Sydney Meyer as Anna Delaney, Joey's best friend and Tim's younger sister
Keara Graves as Grace, Joey's other best friend who is on the school dance team with her
Jaden Jordan as Owen Williams, Jayson's best friend
Brittany Adebumola as Tamika Jones, Dom's best friend who is on the women's basketball team with her
Naiya Ortiz as Sonia Cruz, Dom's other best friend, also on the women's basketball team with her
Crystal Nelson as Tor Sampson, Dom's other best friend who is also on the women's basketball team with her
Ashley Ganger as Meera Pakam, Sid's younger sister
Marcela Avelina as Flora Mejia, Sid's girlfriend
Lola Blackman as Rachel Finer, Leila's best friend
Lindsay Wu as Wendi, Leila's classmate
Tiffany Tong as Mei, Leila's classmate
Jennifer Tong as Su, Leila's classmate
David Iacono as Bo Orlov, Sid's rival teammate
Micah Solis as Nick Rodriguez
Diego Martinez-Tau as Chris Yoon
Cole Bullock as Dante Pierre, Dom's eldest nephew
Mercedes Slater as Odette Pierre, Dom's niece
Osias Reid as Tristian Pierre, Dom's younger nephew
Rachel Boyd as Natalie
Kelsey Falconer as Christina
Alex Castillo as Ms. Lisa Gonzalez
Jason Weinberg as Principal Michael Metta, Grand Army High School's principal
Katie Griffin as Rebecca Connely, Joey's mother
August Blanco Rosenstein as Victor Borin, an out bi student college essay tutor who helps Sid and also a classmate
Magaly Colimon as Antoinette Pierre, Dom's mother
Rod Wilson as Matt Del Marco, Joey's father
Ava Preston as Nina Del Marco, Joey's younger sister
Deanna Interbartolo as Frankie Del Marco, Joey's youngest sister
Michael Brown as Shawn Jackson, Jayson's father
Raven Dauda as Nicole Jackson, Jayson's mother
Geoffrey Pounsett as Mr. Knight, Jayson's music teacher at Grand Army High School
Lynn Weintraub as Rabbi Sadie Schultz	
Zac Kara as Omar Biller, drama club member and assistant director to Meera's play
Sagine Sémajuste as Sabine Pierre, Dom's older sister

Episodes

Production

Development
It was announced in October 2019 that Netflix had ordered a 10-episode adaptation of Katie Cappiello's 2013 play, one that expands on the original work. The storylines are based on real life stories from her students. On June 17, 2021, Netflix canceled the series after one season.

Controversy
On the day of the teaser release, writer Ming Peiffer stated on Twitter that she and two other writers of color had quit the project, citing racist exploitation and abuse allegations against one of the creators.

Casting
It was announced Odessa A'zion would play Joey Del Marco and Amalia Yoo would reprise her role from the stage production as Leila Kwan Zimmer. Also joining the main cast are Maliq Johnson, Amir Bageria, and Odley Jean.

Filming
Principal photography took place in both Toronto and New York City from May to September 2019, with most indoor scenes in Toronto and most outdoor and subway scenes in New York City.

Release
The teaser was released as well as first look images in September 2020, followed by a full trailer in October. Fahamu Pecou painted the promotional artwork for the posters. The series premiered on October 16, 2020 with 9 episodes instead of the original order of 10 episodes.

Reception
For the series, review aggregator Rotten Tomatoes reported an approval rating of 71% based on 14 reviews, with an average rating of 7.34/10. The website's critics consensus reads, "Grand Army is an excellent showcase for its exciting cast of newcomers—even if its attempt at an honest approach to adolescence is too overwrought to make an impact." Metacritic gave the series a weighted average score of 68 out of 100 based on 12 reviews, indicating "generally favorable reviews".
In 2021, Ashley Ganger gave an interview for Vanity Teen magazine, following her appearance on the series, talking about her personal journey and the social influence of the series.

Kristen Baldwin of Entertainment Weekly gave the series a B- and described the series as "ambitious, often to a fault. Still, there are flashes of beauty—let me say again, Odley Jean is a revelation—amid the gritty teen boilerplate." Reviewing the series for Rolling Stone, Alan Sepinwall gave it 4 out of 5 stars and said, "In its best moments, Grand Army enters rare air for high school shows, elevating surprisingly close to the genre's thoughtful standard-bearer, My So-Called Life."

References

External links
 
 

2020 American television series debuts
2020 American television series endings
2020s American high school television series
2020s American LGBT-related drama television series
2020s American teen drama television series
English-language Netflix original programming
Rape in television
Television series about teenagers
Television series based on plays
Television shows filmed in Toronto
Television shows filmed in New York City
Television shows set in New York City